Kyungpook National University Hospital is located in Daegu, South Korea. It was derived from the DongIn Clinic which opened in 1908. It is the central hospital of Gyeongsangbuk-do. In 1952 Kyungpook National University was established, followed by the creation of the Kyungpook National University Hospital.  

The hospital director is Yong-Lim Kim. 

Former hospital president Chung Ho-young was nominated to the position of Minister of Health and Welfare in Yoon Suk-yeol's cabinet, but withdrew his nomination due to allegations of abuses of power. The second nomination for the position, former president Kim Seung-hee, also withdrew her nomination, due to allegations of misappropriating government funds.

External links
Official website in English

References 

Buildings and structures in Daegu
Hospitals in South Korea
Teaching hospitals in South Korea
Hospital
Hospitals established in 1907
Jung District, Daegu
1907 establishments in Korea